In representation theory of mathematics, the Waldspurger formula relates the special values of two L-functions of two related admissible irreducible representations. Jean-Loup Waldspurger, for whom the formula is named, reproved and generalized the result of Vignéras in 1985 via a totally different method which was widely used thereafter by mathematicians to prove similar formulas.

Statement
There is a  such that .

Definition 1. The Legendre symbol 
 Comment. Because all the terms in the right either have value +1, or have value −1, the term in the left can only take value in the set {+1, −1}.
Definition 2.

Definition 3. Let . 

Definition 4.
 Comment. It is not obvious though, that the function  is a generalization of the Gauss sum.

Let  be a field such that . One can choose a K-subspace of  such that (i) ; (ii) . De facto, there is only one such  modulo homothety.

Definition 5.
 
 Comment.

Comments:

We take  to the set   to be the set of all cusp forms of level N and depth 0. Suppose that, .

Definition 1. Let  be the Legendre symbol of c modulo d, . Metaplectic morphism 

Definition 2. Let . Petersson inner product 

Definition 3. Let . Gauss sum 

There is a constant  such that 

Definition 4. Assume that . Whittaker function 

Definition 5.

Definition 6. Atkin–Lehner operator  with 

Definition 7. Assume that,  is a Hecke eigenform. Atkin–Lehner eigenvalue  with 

Definition 8. 

We note the Shimura correspondence by 

Theorem [ , Thm 5.1, p. 60 ]. Then

References

Representation theory
Algebraic number theory
Harmonic analysis
Langlands program